Paul Flemming (born October 8, 1968, in Halifax, Nova Scotia) is a Canadian curler. He currently skips his own team out of Halifax.

Curling career 
Flemming's junior team was successful yet failed to ever win the Nova Scotia Junior Men's Championship, losing in the finals four times. In 1987, the team of Paul Flemming, Mike Mawhinney, Glen MacLeod, and Chris Oxner represented Nova Scotia at the Canada Winter Games in Sydney, Nova Scotia. The team earned an undefeated record in the round robin, including a victory over Ontario's Wayne Middaugh. In the semi-finals of the playoffs Flemming's team beat Saskatchewan to earn a spot in the gold medal match. The Flemming team played John Boswick of Manitoba in the final and they held a lead until Manitoba stole a point in the eighth and two in the tenth end for the win.

Flemming represented Nova Scotia at the Canadian Mixed Curling Championship in 1999 and 2003, winning the Championship both times. In 1999 the team consisted of  Paul Flemming, Colleen Jones, Tom Fetterly, and  Monica Moriarity. In 2003 the team consisted of Paul Flemming, Kim Kelly, Tom Fetterly, and Cathy Donald.

Flemming's competed on Team Nova Scotia at the Canadian Men's Championship, called The Brier, six times: 1998, 1999 and 2013 as skip, 2001 as third for Mark Dacey, and 2005 and 2011 as third for Shawn Adams. In 2001 and 2013 he was awarded the event's Ross Harstone Trophy, which is a player-voted sportsmanship award.

Personal life
Flemming is the younger brother of Canadian actor Peter Flemming. Flemming owns a restaurant called Harbour Fish N' Fries. He has two children.

References

External links

Team Paul Flemming CS Profile

Curlers from Nova Scotia
Sportspeople from Halifax, Nova Scotia
1968 births
Living people
Canadian male curlers
Canadian mixed curling champions
20th-century Canadian people